Canaveral may refer to:

Cape Canaveral, a headland in Brevard County, Florida, USA which is the site of the Kennedy Space Center
Cape Canaveral, Florida, a city in Brevard County, Florida, USA
Cape Canaveral Space Force Station
Kennedy Space Center, also referred to as "Canaveral" or "Cape Canaveral" in some sources
Cape Canaveral Light, lighthouse on Cape Canaveral
Port Canaveral, a port at Cape Canaveral, Florida, USA
Canaveral Groves, Florida, a community in Brevard County, Florida, USA
Canaveral National Seashore, a national seashore in Brevard County, Florida, USA
"Canaveral", a song by Shellac from their 2000 album 1000 Hurts
"canaveral", a word for canebrake (from Spanish cañaveral = "canebrake")
Cañaveral, Peru, a town in Contralmirante Villar, Tumbes, Peru
Cañaveral, Spain, a municipality in Cáceres, Extremadura, Spain
Cañaveral, Coclé, Panama

See also